Strata Records was a short lived jazz record label.  It released less than 10 albums that have become highly desirable since their release. Their cover designs were from John Sinclair.

The entire Strata catalog (including unissued albums) has been re-released on LP by 180 Proof Records.

Discography
SRI-101-74 - The Contemporary Jazz Quintet - Location
SRI-102-74 - Bert Myrick- Live'n Well (1974)	
SRI-103-74 - Sphere - Inside Ourselves (1974)
SRI-104-74 - Maulawi - Maulawi (1974)
SRI-105-75 - Lyman Woodard Organization, The - Saturday Night Special (1975)
SRI-106-75 - Kenny Cox  - Clap Clap (The Joyful Noise)
SRI-107-75 - Contemporary Jazz Quintet - The Black Hole
SRI-108-75 - Ron English- Fish Feet
SRI-109-75 - Larry Nozero Featuring Dennis Tini - Time

References

External links

American record labels
Jazz record labels